Lev Abramovich Kassil (10 July 1905 – 21 June 1970) was a Soviet and Russian writer of juvenile and young adult literature and screenwriter, depicting Soviet life, teenagers and their world, school, sports, cultural life, and war.

Biography
He was born into a Jewish family in Pokrovskaya Sloboda (now Engels). Finished a local gymnasium later transformed into a United labour school. In 1923 Kassil entered Moscow State University, where he studied aerodynamics. He published his first tale in 1925, and eventually became a REF and LEF member. In 1927 Mayakovsky invited him to share in the magazine called New LEF. His most important works were two autobiographical novels for young people dealing with student life before the Revolution, Konduit (The conduct book, 1929, tr. as The Black Book) and Shvambraniya (1931, tr. as The Land of Shvambrania); the two were revised and combined into one book called Konduit i Shvambraniya (1935, tr. as The Black Book and Shwambrania).

In 1936 was the premiere of the film The Goalkeeper written by Lev Kassil. 

His books were often "development novels" describing how young people could, despite their mistakes, reach a mature view of life. Modesty, unselfishness, endurance, and courage were virtues that Kassil held dear.

In 1950 he received the Stalin Prize for his book «Улица младшего сына» (1949, co-authored with M. Polyanovsky), the life story of young Volodia Dubinin and his struggle during the German invasion of the Soviet Union.

Kassil taught at the Maxim Gorky Literature Institute for a long period. In 1965 he was elected member of the Academy of Pedagogical Science of the Soviet Union.

A minor planet, 2149 Schwambraniya, discovered in 1977 by Soviet astronomer Nikolai Chernykh, is named after the fictional land from his novel The Black Book and Schwambrania.

Selected works
The Black Book and Schwambrania (1930-1933) - «Кондуит и Швамбрания»
The Great Opposition
The Goalkeeper of the Republic (1938) - «Вратарь республики»

References

1905 births
1970 deaths
20th-century Russian male writers
20th-century Russian screenwriters
20th-century Russian short story writers
People from Engels, Saratov Oblast
People from Novouzensky Uyezd
Corresponding Members of the USSR Academy of Pedagogical Sciences
Stalin Prize winners
Recipients of the Order of the Red Banner of Labour
Recipients of the Order of the Red Star
Socialist realism writers
Russian children's writers
Russian Jews
Russian magazine editors
Russian male novelists
Russian male writers
Russian screenwriters
Russian short story writers
Soviet children's writers
Soviet Jews
Soviet magazine editors
Soviet male writers
Soviet novelists
Soviet screenwriters
Soviet short story writers
Burials at Novodevichy Cemetery